Vladimir Anatolyevich Smirnov (born 2 August 1977) is a Russian former professional footballer.

Club career
He made his debut in the Russian Premier League in 1997 for FC Rotor Volgograd.

European club competitions
With FC Rotor Volgograd.

 UEFA Cup 1997–98: 1 game.
 UEFA Cup 1998–99: 1 game.

References

1977 births
Sportspeople from Volgograd
Living people
Russian footballers
Russia under-21 international footballers
Association football midfielders
FC Rotor Volgograd players
FC Fakel Voronezh players
FC Ural Yekaterinburg players
Russian Premier League players
FC Sodovik Sterlitamak players
FC Tekstilshchik Kamyshin players
FC Avangard Kursk players
FC Sever Murmansk players